Blabicentrus bella is a species of beetle in the family Cerambycidae. It was described by Galileo and Martins in 2004 and is known from Bolivia, Ecuador, and French Guiana.

References

Desmiphorini
Beetles described in 2004